John Phillip Brantley, Jr. (born October 23, 1965) is a former American football linebacker in the National Football League for the Houston Oilers and the Washington Redskins.  He played college football at the University of Florida and was drafted in the 12th round of the 1988 NFL Draft.

References

External links
NFL.com player page

1965 births
Living people
Sportspeople from Ocala, Florida
American football linebackers
Georgia Bulldogs football players
Houston Oilers players
Birmingham Fire players
Washington Redskins players